is a right-handed pitcher for the Orix Buffaloes in Japan's Nippon Professional Baseball. He played in the 2006 World Baseball Classic.  Originally a starter, Mahara was converted to a closer partway through 2005 season and has been an efficient closer since then.

His best season was in 2007, when Mahara broke the team record for saves by recording 38 and also recording a 1.47 ERA.  The previous record-holder was Rodney Pedraza, who had 35 saves in 2000.  Mahara did not blow a save until late in the season, when Orix Buffaloes slugger Tuffy Rhodes cracked a walk-off home run in the bottom of the 9th at Skymark Stadium.

With the exception of the 2008 season when he missed half the season due to injury, Mahara has recorded at least 22 saves each year since 2005.

In 2011, he was in a slump and  become losing pitcher in two games in Nippon Series. In 2012, he was injured and he didn't play any games. He was traded to Orix Buffaloes in the off season.

External links

NPB.com

1981 births
Living people
People from Kumamoto
Japanese baseball players
Nippon Professional Baseball pitchers
Fukuoka Daiei Hawks players
Fukuoka SoftBank Hawks players
Orix Buffaloes players
2006 World Baseball Classic players
2009 World Baseball Classic players